Bernardo de Irigoyen (1822-1906) was an Argentine lawyer, diplomat and politician.

Bernardo de Irigoyen may also refer to:
 Bernardo de Irigoyen, Santa Fe, Argentina
 Bernardo de Irigoyen, Misiones, Argentina